James R. Chelikowsky is a professor of physics, chemical engineering, chemistry and at The University of Texas at Austin. He is the director of the Institute for Computational Engineering and Sciences' Center for Computational Materials. He holds the W.A. "Tex" Moncrief Jr. Chair of Computational Materials.

Career 

Chelikowsky is known for his research on the optical and dielectric properties of semiconductors, surface and interfacial phenomena in solids, point and extended defects in electronic materials, pressure-induced amorphization in silicates and disordered systems, clusters and confined systems, and the diffusion and microstructure of liquids.

His current research interests include quantum models for functionalized nanostructures, simulated images from probe microscopies, materials informatics applied to the prediction of novel magnetic materials  and high performance algorithms for solving the electronic structure problem.

He has published over 430 papers, including five monographs, and has an h-index of 87.

He earned his BS degree, Summa Cum Laude, in physics from Kansas State University in 1970, a PhD  in physics from the University of California at Berkeley in 1975. He performed postdoctoral work at Bell Laboratories from 1976–1978 and was an assistant professor at the University of Oregon from 1978–1980.  From 1980–1987 he worked at Exxon Research and Engineering Corporate Research Science Laboratories, where he served as group head in theoretical physics and chemistry. In 1987 Chelikowsky  became a professor at the University of Minnesota within the Department of Chemical Engineering and Materials Science.  He was named an Institute of Technology Distinguished Professor at Minnesota in 2001.  He assumed his current position as the W.A. "Tex" Moncrief Jr. Chair of Computational Materials and professor in the Departments of Physics, Chemical Engineering, and Chemistry and Biochemistry in January 2005.

He is also a fellow of the American Association for the Advancement of Science, the American Physical Society and the Materials Research Society. He was also named an outstanding referee for the American Physical Society, a lifetime award.

Honors and awards 

John Simon Guggenheim Fellowship (1995)
David Adler Lectureship Award from the American Physical Society (2006)
David Turnbull Lectureship Award from the Materials Research Society (2011)
Aneesur Rahman Prize for Computational Physics from the American Physical Society (2013)
FMD John Bardeen Award from The  Minerals,  Metals, and Materials Society (2021)
The Foresight Institute Feynman Prize for Theory (2022)

Bibliography 

 Electronic Structure and optical Properties of Semiconductors, with Marvin L. Cohen, Springer, 2012
Quantum Theory of Real Materials, with Steven G. Louie, Springer, 2011
Electronic Materials: A New Era in Materials Science, with Alfonso Franciosi, Springer, 2011
Introduction to the Quantum Theory of Atoms Molecules and Clusters, John Wiley & Sons, Inc., 2019
The Optical Properties of Materials: Volume 579 (MRS Proceedings), with Eric L. Shirley, Steven G. Louie and Gerard Martinez, 2000
Electronic Structure and Optical Properties of Semiconductors, with Marvin L. Cohen, Springer, 1989
Quantum Theory of Real Materials, with Steven G. Louie, Springer, 1996
The Foresight Institute Feynman Prize for Theory (2022)

References 

Year of birth missing (living people)
Living people
University of Texas at Austin faculty
21st-century American physicists
People from Manhattan, Kansas
Kansas State University alumni
University of California, Berkeley alumni
American biochemists
American chemical engineers
University of Oregon faculty
Computational chemists
Fellows of the American Physical Society
Fellows of the American Association for the Advancement of Science
Computational physicists